MV Ever Queen of Asia is a passenger ferry owned and operated by Ever Shipping Lines. She's the former MV Shiraito up until December 1998 when she was sold to Ever.

References

External links 
 MV Ever Queen of Asia - Vessel Finder
 MV Ever Queen of Asia Maritime Connector

1970 ships
Ships built in Japan
Ferries of the Philippines
Ships of the Philippines